Shedding the Past is the 2008 debut album by German techno musician Shed.

Reception

Resident Advisor—an online magazine with a focus on electronic music—named Shedding the Past as the best album of 2008. They also named it the 18th best album of the decade.

Track listing

References

2008 albums
Shed (musician) albums